Andoni López Saratxo (born 5 April 1996) is a Spanish footballer who plays as a left-back for CD Lugo.

Club career
Born in Barakaldo, López graduated from the Athletic Bilbao academy in 2014, having joined the Lezama youth setup in 2006. After two seasons with the C-team (during which period he also played in the UEFA Youth League and the Premier League International Cup), he was promoted to the reserves on 7 June 2016. On 22 August, he made his debut in the third tier, playing the whole ninety minutes of a 3–0 victory against UD Socuéllamos.

In February 2018, López was called to the senior squad by manager José Ángel Ziganda for a domestic league fixture against Girona FC as a replacement for the injured Mikel Balenziaga. On 4 February, he made his first team debut in the match, playing the entire ninety minutes and conceding a penalty in the first half of a 2–0 defeat.

On 17 August 2018, López was loaned to Segunda División side UD Almería until the end of the season. He scored his first professional goal on 4 November, netting the winner in a 2–1 home defeat of Sporting de Gijón.

On 7 August 2019, López moved to fellow second division side Elche CF also in a temporary deal. A backup to Juan Cruz, he contributed with 21 appearances overall as his side achieved promotion to La Liga.

On 1 September 2020, López moved to UD Logroñés in the second level on a two-year contract, with Athletic retaining a buy-back clause. On 28 January 2022, he moved to SD Amorebieta.

On 1 September 2022, after suffering relegation, López joined CD Tenerife still in division two, on a one-year contract. After just two league matches, he moved to fellow league team CD Lugo the following 31 January.

Career statistics

Club

References

External links

1996 births
Living people
Spanish footballers
Footballers from Barakaldo
Association football defenders
La Liga players
Segunda División players
Segunda División B players
Tercera División players
Danok Bat CF players
CD Basconia footballers
Bilbao Athletic footballers
Athletic Bilbao footballers
UD Almería players
Elche CF players
UD Logroñés players
SD Amorebieta footballers
CD Tenerife players
CD Lugo players